The Municipal Borough of Chorley was a local government district in the administrative county of Lancashire, England, with municipal borough status and coterminate with the town of Chorley.

History
Lying within the boundaries of the historic county of Lancashire since the early 12th century, Chorley was originally a township in the ancient parish of Croston until 1793 when it became a civil and ecclesiastical parish in its own right. Following the Poor Law Amendment Act 1834, Chorley joined with other townships (or civil parishes) in the area to become head of the Chorley Poor Law Union on 26 January 1837 which took responsibility for the administration and funding of the Poor Law within that Union area.

Although Chorley had been an independent civil parish since 1793, the old-fashioned government by a chief and deputy parish constables, with assistants, continued until 1853, when a Board of Improvement Commissioners was formed. Ten years later, the Commissioners held a meeting on 29 October 1863 and they duly adopted portions of the Public Health Act 1848 and the Local Government Act 1858.

In 1881, under the Municipal Corporations Act 1835, a charter of incorporation was obtained for the town. The Municipal Borough of Chorley was governed by a mayor and council of eight aldermen and twenty-four councillors, chosen equally from four wards — North, East, South and West. The borough's population remained roughly static in the 20th century, with the 1911 census showing 30,315 people and the 1961 census showing 31,315. It was enlarged by gaining  from parts of the civil parishes of Duxbury, Euxton and Heath Charnock in 1934.

Under the Local Government Act 1972, the municipal borough was abolished on 1 April 1974 and its former area became the core of the larger non-metropolitan Borough of Chorley.

Demography

List of mayors
The following is a list of mayors of the Municipal Borough of Chorley:

 1881–1883: Augustus William Smethurst 
 1883–1884: Thomas Anderton 
 1884–1885: Thomas Whittle 
 1885–1886: John Heald 
 1886–1887: Thomas Forrester 
 1887–1889: Arthur George Leigh 
 1889–1891: Sir Henry Fleming Hibbert
 1891–1893: John Whittle 
 1893–1894: James Lawrence 
 1894–1896: Thomas Howarth 
 1896–1897: Humphrey Norris Whittle 
 1897–1900: Bertram Jackson 
 1900–1902: George Thomas Brown (1st term)
 1902–1904: Henry Bradley 
 1904–1905: George Thomas Brown (2nd term)
 1905–1907: James Sharples 
 1907–1909: James Winder Stone 
 1909–1911: Henry William Hitchen 
 1911–1912: Alban Jolly 
 1912–1913: William Henry Killick 
 1913–1915: Ralph Hindle 
 1915–1917: James Turner 
 1917–1920: Lewis Wilson 
 1920–1922: John Fearnhead 
 1922–1924: John Sharples (1st term)
 1924–1925: John Karfoot 
 1925–1925: John Sharples (2nd term)
 1925–1927: Arnold Gillet (1st term)
 1927–1930: Ernest Ashton 
 1930–1931: Arnold Gillet (2nd term)
 1931–1933: Bertha Maud Gillett 
 1933–1935: Peter Henry Hodgkinson 
 1935–1936: William Wilcock (1st term)
 1936–1939: Ralph Gent 
 1939–1942: Tom Hamer 
 1942–1944: Fredric Brindle 
 1944–1946: John Green 
 1946–1947: Richard Evans 
 1947–1949: Ernest Warburton 
 1949–1950: Samuel Cookson 
 1950–1951: George Brown Fletcher 
 1951–1952: Charles Williams 
 1952–1953: Thomas Heaton 
 1953–1954: Edith May Edwards 
 1954–1955: Bertram Harry Gaskell 
 1955–1956: William Wilcock (2nd term)
 1956–1957: Willie Lowe 
 1957–1958: Thomas Grime 
 1958–1959: Edith Cunliffe 
 1959–1960: Constance Monks 
 1960–1961: Wilfred Rawcliffe MBE JP 
 1961–1962: George Reginald Rigby 
 1962–1963: Alic Robert Sheppard 
 1963–1964: David Dunn 
 1964–1965: Ian Sellars 
 1965–1966: Tom Clifton Shorrock 
 1966–1967: George Frederick Jones 
 1967–1968: Annie Forshaw 
 1968–1969: Walter Bleasdale 
 1969–1970: Adam Barnes 
 1970–1971: Thomas Rowlandson 
 1971–1972: Henry Vickers Davies 
 1972–1973: Dennis Edmund Seabrook 
 1973–1974: William Wilcock (3rd term)

Notes

External links
Boundary Map of Chorley Ch/AP/CP
Boundary Map of Chorley MB
Boundary Map of Chorley USD

Local government in Chorley
History of Lancashire
Municipal boroughs of England
1881 establishments in England
Districts of England abolished by the Local Government Act 1972
Municipal